Andreas Rett (January 2, 1924 – April 25, 1997) was an Austrian neurologist and author. He is famous for his research on neurodevelopmental disorders, particularly for his description of Rett syndrome, which was named after him, and for pioneering treatment based on the belief that disabled children also have a right to fulfillment of their physical, emotional, and psychological needs. He received many awards, including the Grand Decoration of Honour for Services to the Republic of Austria.

Biography
Rett was born in Fürth, Germany and went to school in Innsbruck, Austria. His father owned a cleaning services company and wanted his son to follow in his footsteps, but Andreas Rett instead chose to study medicine, resulting in his father disinheriting him. He graduated as a physician in 1949. He then trained in paediatrics, and in 1955 he was appointed head of the facility for children with Down Syndrome at a home for the aged in Lainz, Vienna. In 1963 he built up a factory, in which neurologically sick youngsters could work. His belief was that disabled children also do have a right to fulfillment of their physical, emotional, and psychological needs.

Rett's academic career began in 1967, when he was appointed as lecturer in neurology and pediatrics at the University of Vienna, in 1973 being promoted to the rank of associate professor. In 1966 he published the first description of Rett syndrome. From 1967 he was also head of the Ludwig Boltzmann Institute for Research in Brain Disordered Children. He has published more than 250 articles.

Membership in Nazi Party
After Rett's death, he received criticism for having been listed as a member of the Hitler Jugend and the Nazi Party as a child and young adult. Andreas Rett was nine years old when the Nazis came to power in Germany and 21 years old at the time of the regime's demise. In recent years he has also been criticized for using research data derived from the Nazi program of Action T4, which was the name given to the mass murder of hundreds of thousands of people, including of children, under the guise of medical euthanasia. Although there is no evidence Rett was directly involved in Action T4, his membership in the Nazi party is notable given that other wartime figures whose history has come under re-examination, such as Austrian physician Hans Asperger, never joined the party.

Decorations and awards
 1958: Karl Renner Prize
 1976: Austrian Cross of Honour for Science and Art, 1st class
 1982: Paracelsus Ring of Villach
 1988: City of Vienna Prize for Medical Sciences
 1989: Grand Decoration of Honour for Services to the Republic of Austria
 2002: Andreas Rett Park in Hietzing (Vienna)

References

External links
 Andreas Rett by whonamedit.com
 

1924 births
1997 deaths
People from Fürth
Austrian neurologists
Austrian male writers
Austrian medical writers
University of Innsbruck alumni
Academic staff of the University of Vienna
Austrian Nazis
Aktion T4
Recipients of the Austrian Cross of Honour for Science and Art, 1st class
Recipients of the Grand Decoration for Services to the Republic of Austria
20th-century Austrian physicians
Nazi Party members